"Downtown's Dead" is a song co-written and recorded by American country music singer Sam Hunt. It is Hunt's eighth single release, and the follow-up to his 2017 hit "Body Like a Back Road" as well as the second single from his second studio album Southside. The song, which he wrote with Zach Crowell, Shane McAnally, Josh Osborne, and Charlie Handsome, is about the loneliness felt after a break-up. The song is Hunt's lowest charting single of his career, with a peak at number 15 on the Country Airplay chart.

Content and history
Co-writer Zach Crowell told Taste of Country that "It was an idea that Sam brought and we chipped away at over the course of a handful of different writes." The two then presented the idea of "Downtown's Dead" to Shane McAnally and Josh Osborne, who experimented with different sounds before deciding to make the lead instrument an acoustic guitar. The lyrics take inspiration from a breakup that Hunt had with his wife, Hannah, and it expresses the loneliness that the narrator feels when by himself in a public setting. The song was described by Rolling Stone as featuring a "woozy Latin guitar riff" and a "hungover narrative about a city that no longer holds the same charm it once did." Hunt announced the single's release via Instagram in May 2018.

Charts

Weekly charts

Year-end charts

Certifications

References

2018 songs
2018 singles
Country ballads
2010s ballads
Sam Hunt songs
Songs written by Sam Hunt
Songs written by Shane McAnally
Songs written by Josh Osborne
Songs written by Zach Crowell
MCA Nashville Records singles
Songs about loneliness